This is a list of people who did not pledge allegiance to Abu Bakr.

Ali had been widely expected to succeed Muhammad upon his death, due to their closeness and Muhammad's stated preference. As he performed Muhammad's funeral rites, a group of Companions of the Prophet left and proclaimed Abu Bakr as the caliph, while others remained loyal to Ali.

Background 

In the immediate aftermath of Muhammad's death in 11 AH (632 CE), several of the Ansar (natives of Medina) gathered in the Saqifah (courtyard) of the Saida clan. According to Madelung, the Ansar likely believed that their allegiance to Muhammad had elapsed with his death and expected that Muhammad's community would disintegrate. For this reason, the purpose of their meeting might had simply been to re-establish control over their city, Medina, under the belief that the majority of the Muhajirun (migrants from Mecca) would return to Mecca anyway.

Upon learning about the meeting, Muhammad's companions Abu Bakr and Umar quickly forced their way into Saqifah. After a heated meeting, in which a chief of the Ansar was beaten into submission by Umar, the small group of Muslims gathered at Saqifah agreed on Abu Bakr as the new head of the Muslim community. The Saqifah event excluded Muhammad's family, who were preparing to bury him, and most of the Muhajirun. Many members of Muhammad's clan, the Banu Hashim, as well as a number of Muhammad's companions opposed the nomination of Abu Bakr; they held that Ali was the rightful successor of Muhammad, appointed by him at the Event of Ghadir Khumm. The issue over the succession to Muhammad would eventually lead to the formation of the two main sects of Islam, with Sunnis considering Abu Bakr to be Muhammad's successor and Shias believing that Ali was the rightful successor to Muhammad.

List
According to various sources, many people did not pledge allegiance to Abu Bakr immediately after the Saqifah. Some did later, for various reasons. They included:

Notes

References

Sources
  Ebook: 
 
 
 
 
 
 

People from Mecca
People from Medina